Volha Antonava (born 29 February 1992) is a track cyclist from Belarus. She represented her nation at the 2015 UCI Track Cycling World Championships where she rode with her team a Belarusian record in the team pursuit.

Major results
2015
3rd Points Race, Grand Prix Minsk

References

External links
 profile at Cyclingarchives.com

1992 births
Belarusian female cyclists
Sportspeople from Turnhout
Cyclists from Antwerp Province
Living people
Cyclists at the 2015 European Games
European Games competitors for Belarus